The Canon de 75 modèle 1922 Schneider was a field gun designed by Schneider in the early 1920s. France didn't buy any as it had an enormous stock of surplus Canon de 75 modèle 1897 field guns on hand and it was offered for export. Chamberlain and Gander claim that Finland bought some and used them during the Winter War.

References 

 Chamberlain, Peter & Gander, Terry. Light and Medium Field Artillery. New York: Arco, 1975

World War II field artillery
75 mm artillery
Schneider Electric
Artillery of France
World War II artillery of Finland